Phil Vassar is the debut studio album by the American country music artist of the same name, released on February 25, 2000. It features the singles "Carlene", "Just Another Day in Paradise", "Rose Bouquet", "Six-Pack Summer" and "That's When I Love You". All of these, except "Rose Bouquet", charted in the Top Ten on the Billboard Hot Country Singles & Tracks (now Hot Country Songs) charts. "Just Another Day in Paradise" was Vassar's first Number One hit on that chart.

Content
The track "Drive Away" was previously recorded by Sons of the Desert on their 1997 debut album Whatever Comes First.

Critical reception

Giving it 4 out of 5 stars, Vince Ripol of AllMusic wrote that "On his own, Vassar is an enthusiastic vocalist, a skilled pianist, and a gifted composer of spirited, nostalgic tales."

Track listing

Personnel
Compiled from liner notes.
 Mike Brignardello – bass guitar
 Larry Byrom – acoustic guitar
 Tim Davis – background vocals
 Dan Dugmore – steel guitar
 Larry Franklin – fiddle, mandolin
 Paul Franklin – steel guitar
 Aubrey Haynie – fiddle, mandolin 
 Michael Landau – electric guitar
 B. James Lowry – electric guitar
 Terry McMillan – percussion
 Brent Mason – electric guitar
 Jo Dee Messina – background vocals on "That's When I Love You"
 Steve Nathan – keyboards
 Collin Raye – background vocals on "Carlene"
 Chris Rodriguez – background vocals
 Phil Vassar – piano, lead vocals
 Lonnie Wilson – drums
 Glenn Worf – bass guitar

Charts

Weekly charts

Year-end charts

References

2000 debut albums
Arista Records albums
Phil Vassar albums
Albums produced by Byron Gallimore